The 1912 Missouri gubernatorial election was held on November 5, 1912 and resulted in a victory for the Democratic nominee, Missouri Attorney General Elliott Woolfolk Major, over the Republican candidate, former Lt. Gov. John C. McKinley, Progressive Albert D. Nortoni, and candidates representing the Socialist, Prohibition, and Socialist Labor parties. Major defeated former representative William S. Cowherd and former lieutenant governor August Bolte for his party's nomination, while McKinley defeated former representative Arthur P. Murphy and former Secretary of State John Ephraim Swanger.

Results

References

Missouri
1912
Gubernatorial
November 1912 events in the United States